In mathematics, elliptic curve primality testing techniques, or elliptic curve primality proving (ECPP), are among the quickest and most widely used methods in primality proving. It is an idea put forward by Shafi Goldwasser and Joe Kilian in 1986 and turned into an algorithm by A. O. L. Atkin the same year. The concept of using elliptic curves in factorization had been developed by H. W. Lenstra in 1985, and the implications for its use in primality testing (and proving) followed quickly.

Primality testing is a field that has been around since the time of Fermat, in whose time most algorithms were based on factoring, which become unwieldy with large input; modern algorithms treat the problems of determining whether a number is prime and what its factors are separately.  It became of practical importance with the advent of modern cryptography.  Although many current tests result in a probabilistic output (N is either shown composite, or probably prime, such as with the Baillie–PSW primality test or the Miller–Rabin test), the elliptic curve test proves primality (or compositeness) with a quickly verifiable certificate.

As a result, these methods required some luck and are generally slow in practice.

Elliptic curve primality proving

It is a general-purpose algorithm, meaning it does not depend on the number being of a special form. ECPP is currently in practice the fastest known algorithm for testing the primality of general numbers, but the worst-case execution time is not known. ECPP heuristically runs in time:

ECPP works the same way as most other primality tests do, finding a group and showing its size is such that  is prime. For ECPP the group is an elliptic curve over a finite set of quadratic forms such that  is trivial to factor over the group.

ECPP generates an Atkin–Goldwasser–Kilian–Morain certificate of primality by recursion and then
attempts to verify the certificate. The step that takes the most CPU time is the certificate generation, because factoring over a class field must be performed. The certificate can be verified quickly, allowing a check of operation to take very little time.

The certification was performed by Andreas Enge using his fastECPP software CM.

Proposition

The elliptic curve primality tests are based on criteria analogous to the Pocklington criterion, on which that test is based,  where the group
We will now state a proposition on which to base our test, which is analogous to the Pocklington criterion, and gives rise to the Goldwasser–Kilian–Atkin form of the elliptic curve primality test.

Let m be an integer.

(1) mP = 0

(2) (m/q)P is defined and not equal to 0

Then N is prime.

Proof

If N is composite, then there exists a prime  that divides N.  Define  as the elliptic curve defined by the same equation as E but evaluated modulo p rather than modulo N.  Define  as the order of the group .  By Hasse's theorem on elliptic curves we know

 

and thus  and there exists an integer u with the property that

 

Let  be the point P evaluated modulo p. Thus, on  we have

 

This contradicts (2), because if (m/q)P is defined and not equal to 0 (mod N), then the same method calculated modulo p instead of modulo N will yield:

Goldwasser–Kilian algorithm
From this proposition an algorithm can be constructed to prove an integer, N, is prime.  This is done as follows:

Choose three integers at random, a, x, y and set

 

Next we need an algorithm to count the number of points on E.   Applied to E, this algorithm (Koblitz and others suggest Schoof's algorithm) produces a number m which is the number of points on curve E over FN, provided N is prime. If the point-counting algorithm stops at an undefined expression this allows to determine a non-trivial factor of N. If it succeeds, we apply a criterion for deciding whether our curve E is acceptable.

If we can write m in the form  where  is a small integer and q a large probable prime (a number that passes a probabilistic primality test, for example), then we do not discard E. Otherwise, we discard our curve and randomly select another triple (a, x, y) to start over. The idea here is to find an m that is divisible by a large prime number q. This prime is a few digits smaller than m (or N) so q will be easier to prove prime than N.

Assuming we find a curve which passes the criterion, proceed to calculate mP and kP. If any of the two calculations produce an undefined expression, we can get a non-trivial factor of N. If both calculations succeed, we examine the results.

If  it is clear that N is not prime, because if N were prime then E would have order m, and any element of E would become 0 on multiplication by m.  If kP = 0, then the algorithm discards E and starts over with a different a, x, y triple.

Now if  and  then our previous proposition tells us that N is prime.  However, there is one possible problem, which is the primality of q.  This is verified using the same algorithm.  So we have described a recursive algorithm, where the primality of N depends on the primality of q and indeed smaller 'probable primes' until some threshold is reached where q is considered small enough to apply a non-recursive deterministic algorithm.

Problems with the algorithm 
Atkin and Morain state "the problem with GK is that Schoof's algorithm seems almost impossible to implement."  It is very slow and cumbersome to count all of the points on E using Schoof's algorithm, which is the preferred algorithm for the Goldwasser–Kilian algorithm.  However, the original algorithm by Schoof is not efficient enough to provide the number of points in short time. These comments have
to be seen in the historical context, before the improvements by Elkies and Atkin to Schoof's method.

A second problem Koblitz notes is the difficulty of finding the curve E whose number of points is of the form kq, as above.  There is no known theorem which guarantees we can find a suitable E in polynomially many attempts. The distribution of primes on the Hasse interval
,
which contains m, is not the same as the distribution of primes in the group orders, counting curves with multiplicity. However, this is not a significant problem in practice.

Atkin–Morain elliptic curve primality test (ECPP)
In a 1993 paper, Atkin and Morain described an algorithm ECPP which avoided the trouble of relying on a cumbersome point counting algorithm (Schoof's).   The algorithm still relies on the proposition stated above, but rather than randomly generating elliptic curves and searching for a proper m, their idea was to construct a curve E where the number of points is easy to compute.  Complex multiplication is key in the construction of the curve.

Now, given an N for which primality needs to be proven we need to find a suitable m and q, just as in the Goldwasser–Kilian test, that will fulfill the proposition and prove the primality of N. (Of course, a point P and the curve itself, E, must also be found.)

ECPP uses complex multiplication to construct the curve E, doing so in a way that allows for m (the number of points on E) to be easily computed.  We will now describe this method:

Utilization of complex multiplication requires a negative discriminant, D, such that D can be written as the product of two elements  , or completely equivalently, we can write the equation:

 

For some a, b.

 

For N to split into the two elements, we need that  (where  denotes the Legendre symbol). This happens for only 13 values of D, which are the elements of {−3, −4, −7, −8, −11, −12, −16, −19, −27, −28, −43, −67, −163}

The test 
Pick discriminants D in sequence of increasing h(D).  For each D check if  and whether 4N can be written as:

 

This part can be verified using Cornacchia's algorithm.  Once acceptable D and a have been discovered, calculate .  Now if m has a prime factor q of size

 

use the complex multiplication method to construct the curve E and a point P on it.
Then we can use our proposition to verify the primality of N.  Note that if m does not have a large prime factor or cannot be factored quickly enough, another choice of D can be made.

Complex multiplication method 
For completeness, we will provide an overview of complex multiplication, the way in which an elliptic curve can be created, given our D (which can be written as a product of two elements).

It is necessary to calculate the elliptic j-invariants of the h(D) classes of the order of discriminant D as complex numbers. There are several formulas to calculate these.

Next create the monic polynomial , which has roots corresponding to the h(D) values.  Note, that  is the class polynomial.  From complex multiplication theory, we know that  has integer coefficients, which allows us to estimate these coefficients accurately enough to discover their true values.

Now, if N is prime, CM tells us that  splits modulo N into a product of h(D) linear factors, based on the fact that D was chosen so that N splits as the product of two elements.  Now if j is one of the h(D) roots modulo N we can define E as:

 

c is any quadratic nonresidue mod N, and r is either 0 or 1.

Given a root j there are only two possible nonisomorphic choices of E, one for each choice of r.  We have the cardinality of these curves as

  or

Discussion
Just as with the Goldwasser–Killian test, this one leads to a down-run procedure.  Again, the culprit is q.  Once we find a q that works, we must check it to be prime, so in fact we are doing the whole test now for q.  Then again we may have to perform the test for factors of q.  This leads to a nested certificate where at each level we have an elliptic curve E, an m and the prime in doubt, q.

Example of Atkin–Morain ECPP 
We construct an example to prove that  is prime using the Atkin–Morain ECPP test.

For our example  is chosen. This is because  and also, using Cornacchia's algorithm, we know that  and thus a = 25 and b = 1.

The next step is to calculate m. It must satisfy the condition that 

In this case, m = 143 = 11×13. So unfortunately we cannot choose 11 or 13 as our q, for it does not satisfy the necessary inequality. We are saved, however, by an analogous proposition to that which we stated before the Goldwasser–Kilian algorithm, which comes from a paper by Morain. It states, that given our m, we look for an s which divides m, but is not necessarily prime, and check whether, for each  which divides s

 

for some point P on our yet to be constructed curve.

If s satisfies the inequality, and its prime factors satisfy the above, then N is prime.

So in our case, we choose s = m = 143. Thus our possible 's are 11 and 13. First, it is clear that , and so we need only check the values of

 

But before we can do this, we must construct our curve, and choose a point P. In order to construct the curve, we make use of complex multiplication. In our case we compute the J-invariant

 

Next we compute

and we know our elliptic curve is of the form:

 ,

So we can begin with

which yields

Now, utilizing the point P = (6,6) on E it can be verified that 

It is simple to check that 13(6, 6) = (12, 65) and 11P = (140, 147), and so, by Morain's proposition, N is prime.

Complexity and running times
Goldwasser and Kilian's elliptic curve primality proving algorithm terminates in expected polynomial time for at least

 

of prime inputs.

Conjecture
Let  be the number of primes smaller than x

 

for sufficiently large x.

If one accepts this conjecture then the Goldwasser–Kilian algorithm terminates in expected polynomial time for every input.

Now consider another conjecture, which will give us a bound on the total time of the algorithm.

Conjecture 2
Suppose there exist positive constants  and  such that the amount of primes in the interval

    is larger than   

Then the Goldwasser Kilian algorithm proves the primality of N in an expected time of

 

For the Atkin–Morain algorithm, the running time stated is

  for some

Primes of special form
For some forms of numbers, it is possible to find 'short-cuts' to a primality proof. This is the case for the Mersenne numbers. In fact, due to their special structure, which allows for easier verification of primality, the six largest known prime numbers are all Mersenne numbers. There has been a method in use for some time to verify primality of Mersenne numbers, known as the Lucas–Lehmer test. This test does not rely on elliptic curves. However we present a result where numbers of the form  where , n odd can be proven prime (or composite) using elliptic curves. Of course this will also provide a method for proving primality of Mersenne numbers, which correspond to the case where n = 1. The following method is drawn from the paper Primality Test for  using Elliptic Curves, by Yu Tsumura.

Group structure of E(FN)

Theorem 1. 

Theorem 2.  or  depending on whether or not m is a quadratic residue modulo p.

Theorem 3. Let Q = (x,y) on E be such that x a quadratic non-residue modulo p.

Theorem 4.
 
Then p is a prime if and only if there exists a Q = (x,y) on E, such that  for i = 1, 2, ...,k − 1 and  where  is a sequence with initial value .

The algorithm 
We provide the following algorithm, which relies mainly on Theorems 3 and 4.  To verify the primality of a given number , perform the following steps:

(1) Choose  such that ,  and find  such that .

Calculate .  If  then  is composite, otherwise proceed to (2).

(2)  Set  as the sequence with initial value .

Otherwise, proceed to (3).

(3) If    then  is prime.  Otherwise,  is composite.  This completes the test.

Justification of the algorithm 
In (1), an elliptic curve, E is picked, along with a point Q on E, such that the x-coordinate of Q is a quadratic nonresidue.  We can say

 

and therefore the order of Q''' is    d | n.

This means Q = nQ has order .  Therefore, if (1) concludes that N is composite, it truly is composite.  (2) and (3) check if Q has order .  Thus, if (2) or (3) conclude N is composite, it is composite.

Now, if the algorithm concludes that N is prime, then that means  satisfies the condition of Theorem 4, and so N is truly prime.

There is an algorithm as well for when n'' is large; however, for this we refer to the aforementioned article.

References

External links
Elliptic Curves and Primality Proving by Atkin and Morain.

Chris Caldwell, "Primality Proving 4.2: Elliptic curves and the ECPP test" at the Prime Pages.
François Morain, "The ECPP home page" (includes old ECPP software for some architectures).
Marcel Martin, "Primo" (binary for Linux 64-bit)
PARI/GP, a computer algebra system with functions to create Atkin-Morain and Primo primality certificates
GMP-ECPP, a free ECPP implementation
LiDIA, a free C++ library for Linux with ECPP support
CM, another free library that contains an ECPP implementation

Primality tests